The Frederick W. Lanchester Prize is an Institute for Operations Research and the Management Sciences prize (U.S. $5,000 cash prize and medallion) given for the best contribution to operations research and the management sciences published in English.  It is named after Frederick W. Lanchester.

Past winners
Source: INFORMS
 1954 Leslie C. Edie
 1955 Georges Brigham
 1956 Richard E. Zimmerman
 1957 Maurice F. C . Allais, Clayton J. Thomas and Walter L. Deemer, Jr
 1959 Robert E. Chandler, Robert Herman, Elliott Waters Montroll and A.M. Lee
 1960 Herman F. Karreman
 1961 Elio M. Ventura
 1962 Robert M. Oliver and A.H. Samuel
 1963 Paul C. Gilmore and Ralph E. Gomory
 1964 Frederick M. Scherer
 1965 Michel Balinski and Rufus Isaacs
 1966 Stafford Beer
 1967 Douglass J. Wilde and Charles S. Beightler
 1968 Anthony V. Fiacco, Garth P. McCormick and Philip M. Morse
 1969 Harvey M. Wagner
 1971 Edward E. David, John G. Truxal and E.J. Piel
 1972 Richard C. Larson
 1973 Herbert Scarf, Terje Hansen, Louis M. Goreux and Alan S. Manne
 1974 Peter Kolesar and Warren E. Walker
 1975 Lawrence D. Stone
 1976 Ralph Keeney, Howard Raiffa and Leonard Kleinrock
 1977 Richard Karp, Gérard P. Cornuéjols, Marshall L. Fisher and George Nemhauser
 1979 Michael R. Garey and David S. Johnson
 1980 David M. Eddy
 1981 David Hopkins and William Massy
 1982 Karl-Heinz Borgwardt
 1983 Martin Shubik, Ellis L. Johnson, Manfred W. Padberg and Harlan Crowder
 1984 Narendra Karmarkar and Robert Tarjan
 1985 Michael Maltz
 1986 Alexander Schrijver and Peter Whittle
 1988 Robin Roundy
 1989 Jean Walrand, George L. Nemhauser and Laurence A. Wolsey
 1990 Alvin E. Roth and Marilda Sotomayor
 1991 Frank P. Kelly
 1992 Masakazu Kojima, Nimrod Megiddo, Shinji Mizuno, Toshihito Noma and Akiko Yoshise
 1993 Thomas L. Magnanti, James B. Orlin and Ravindra K. Ahuja
 1994 Edward Kaplan, Richard Cottle, Jong-Shi Pang and Richard Stone
 1995 Robert J. Aumann, Michael B. Maschler, Martin L. Puterman, and Richard E. Stearns
 1996 George Fishman
 1997 R. Tyrrell Rockafellar and Roger J-B Wets
 2000 Olvi Mangasarian
 2001 J. Michael Harrison
 2003 Nicholas Vieille and Ward Whitt
 2004 Alexander Schrijver
 2005 Kalyan T. Talluri and Garrett J. van Ryzin
 2006 Paul Glasserman
 2007 David L. Applegate, Robert E. Bixby, Vašek Chvátal, and William J. Cook
 2008 Warren P. Adams and Hanif D. Sherali, and Lawrence M. Wein
 2009 Not awarded
 2010 Not awarded
 2011 David Easley and Jon Kleinberg
 2012 Not awarded
 2013 David P. Williamson and David Shmoys
 2014 Not awarded
 2015 Michele Conforti, Giacomo Zambell and Gérard P. Cornuéjols
 2016 Not awarded
 2017 Not awarded
 2018 Not awarded
 2019 Tim Roughgarden, Omar Besbes, Yonatan Gur, N. Bora Keskin and Assaf Zeevi
 2020: Peyman Mohajerin Esfahani, Daniel Kuhn
 2021: Dimitris Bertsimas, Jack Dunn

See also
 List of business and industry awards
 List of prizes named after people

References

Business and industry awards
American awards
Awards established in 1954